Livio Castiglioni (16 January 1911 – 30 April 1971) was an Italian architect and designer. He made a significant contribution to twentieth-century Italian lighting design and was an early proponent of the practice of industrial design in Italy.

Early life and education 
Livio Castiglioni was born in Milan on 16 January 1911, the son of Livia Bolla and the sculptor Giannino Castiglioni, and the elder brother of the architects Achille and Pier Giacomo Castiglioni.

He received a degree in architecture from the Polytechnic University of Milan in 1936 and subsequently went into practice with his brother Pier Giacomo and Luigi Caccia Dominioni. After the Second World War the youngest Castiglioni brother, Achille, joined their architecture and design studio; in the mid-1950s Livio left to establish his own design practice.

Work and career 

One of his first works of industrial design was the 1939 "F.I.M.I. –  547" tabletop radio, which is amongst the earliest examples of this product typology to challenge traditional shapes and aesthetics, making it a turning point in the history of Italian industrial design. He was a consultant to Phonola until 1956 and then for Brionvega from 1960 to 1964.

In 1969–1970 he and Gianfranco Frattini designed the "Boalum" light for Artemide (the name combines "Boa" and "lum" from "lume", an Italian word for light). The design was still in production in 2023, over fifty years after it was first manufactured.

Castiglioni was one of the founding members of the Associazione per il Disegno Industriale in Milan and was its president in 1959–1960. He is also credited as being the originator of the Compasso d'Oro award.

Legacy 
Castiglioni died in Milan on 30 April 1971 and is buried in the cemetery of Chiaravalle.

Reflecting on his friendship with the Castiglionis, the designer Massimo Vignelli said:In reality, the Castiglioni brothers were one person. Symbiosis of thought, creative ability, inspiration and execution were an integral part of their being. Talking to one of them or all three of them was the same, they were completely interchangeable, same voice, same accent, same grin, same laughter, same gestures. They were the Castiglioni, like their work, indivisible fruit of the same research, of the same passion, of a great ability to transform the world around us into a new memorable gesture.

In 2014 the city of Milan named a street after the three Castiglioni brothers (Via Fratelli Castiglioni).

References

External links 

 Livio Castiglioni, Museum of Modern Art collection
 Great Masters | Livio Castiglioni
 "Achille e Pier Giacomo Castiglioni", RAI Television documentary, Part One (in Italian)
 "Achille e Pier Giacomo Castiglioni", RAI Television documentary, Part Two (in Italian)
 
 Quotes about Livio Castilioni on Italian Wikiquote

1911 births
1979 deaths
Polytechnic University of Milan alumni
20th-century Italian architects
Architects from Milan
Italian industrial designers
Italian furniture designers
Italian designers
Product designers
Lighting designers
Industrial design